Brynild Anundsen (December 29, 1844 – March 25, 1913) was a Norwegian-American newspaper editor and publisher. He was the founder and publisher of Decorah Posten, a Norwegian language newspaper.

Background
Brynild Anundsen  was born at  Skien in Telemark, Norway. He was the son of Anund Brynildsen Brækkejord (1817–1903) and Maren Amundsdatter Berberg (1812–1883). Anundsen immigrated to the United States during 1864, settling first in La Crosse, Wisconsin.  He subsequently served as a private in the Union Army during the American Civil War between 1864 and 1865.

Career
Anundsen, who had learned the printer's trade in Norway, worked for the Norwegian language newspapers Emigranten in  Madison, Wisconsin, and Fædrelandet og emigranten of La Crosse, Wisconsin. In 1867 he moved to Decorah, Iowa, where he established Ved Arnen, a Norwegian language literary magazine in 1866.
In 1868 he took over the printing of the journal, Kirkelig Maanedstidende for the Norwegian Synod, an arrangement which continued until 1877. He started the newspaper Fra Fjærnt og Nær in 1869.

On September 18, 1874, Anundsen started Decorah Posten. It was a well-edited newspaper, its size and familiar format developed gradually. The publisher avoided areas of political and religious controversy, which had destroyed so many earlier papers. Anundsen made a success of the Decorah Posten and went on to establish the Anundsen Publishing Company. Anundsen was a founder of the Norwegian Society in America (Norwegian: Det Norske Selskab i Amerika).
In 1878 he participated in the founding of the Norwegian Society in Decorah and 1903 The Norwegian Society of America. In 1895, he was co-founder and first president of the Norwegian-Danish Press Association of the United States.

Personal life
In 1865, Anundsen was married in La Crosse, Wisconsin, to Esther Mathilde Charlotte Hofstrom (1838–1889), a native of Sweden. Following the death of his first wife, he married Helma Beatha Hegg (1872–1951) in 1901. He was the father of Fred Anundsen (1872–1931) and Brynjolf Anundsen (1902–1984).

In 1906 he represented the state of Iowa at the coronation of Haakon VII of Norway and Queen Maud and was made a Knight First Class of the Royal Norwegian Order of St. Olav by King Haakon VII. Anundsen was an active member of the United Lutheran Church of Decorah.

References

Other sources
Andersen, Arlow W.  (1990) Rough Road to Glory: The Norwegian-American Press Speaks Out on Public Affairs, 1875 to 1925 (Balch Institute Press) 
Brøndal, Jørn  (2004) Ethnic Leadership and Midwestern Politics: Scandinavian Americans and the Progressive Movement in Wisconsin, 1890-1914 (University of Illinois Press)  
Øverland, Orm  (1996) The Western Home: a literary history of Norwegian America (Norwegian-American Historical Association) 
Lovoll, Odd S.  (2010) Norwegian Newspapers in America: Connecting Norway and the New Land (Minnesota Historical Society)

Related reading
Bailey, Edwin C. (1913) Past and present of Winneshiek County, Iowa: A record of settlement, organization, progress, and achievement 
Nelson, O. N. (1904) History of the Scandinavians and Successful Scandinavians in the United States (O.N. Nelson & Co.)

External links
Portrait of Brynild Anundsen
Anundsen Publishing Company Official Website

1844 births
1913 deaths
People from Skien
American Lutherans
American publishers (people)
People from Decorah, Iowa
Writers from La Crosse, Wisconsin
Union Army soldiers
Norwegian emigrants to the United States
Recipients of the St. Olav's Medal
19th-century Lutherans
19th-century American businesspeople